Getano Belford Lui Jnr , is an indigenous Australian  community leader.

Career
Lui is Councillor on the Torres Strait Islands Regional Council (TSIRC) (State) and Deputy Chair and Member for Iama (Yam Island), and also on the Board of the Torres Strait Regional Authority (TRSA) where he served as inaugural chair.
Lui has also been Chair of the Yam Island Community Council, Islanders Board of Industry and Service and Island Coordination Council.

In 1993, Lui delivered one of the annual series of Australian Broadcasting Corporation Boyer Lectures called "Voices of the Land".

Personal
The son of Getano Lui Snr, Lui resides on Yam Island.

Honours and awards
 1994 Member of the Order of Australia for service to the Torres Strait Islander Community.
 2001 Centenary Medal for distinguished service through the Yam Island Council

References

Living people
Members of the Order of Australia
Recipients of the Centenary Medal
Torres Strait Islanders
Year of birth missing (living people)